Friendship is a census-designated place in western Nile Township, Scioto County, Ohio, United States. As of the 2010 census it had a population of 351. It has a post office with the ZIP code 45630.  It lies along U.S. Route 52.

The citizens of Friendship are served by the Nile Township Volunteer Fire Department and the Washington-Nile Local School District (Portsmouth West High School).

Nearby attractions
 Portsmouth murals and floodwall
 Shawnee State Park, Forest, lodge, golf course, and marina

Notable person
 Al Bridwell, former Major League Baseball player

References

External links
 Shawnee State Park

Census-designated places in Ohio
Census-designated places in Scioto County, Ohio